Here is a list of parks and areas of natural interest in Warrington, England.

 Alexandra Park (Stockton Heath)
 Bank Park
 Birchwood Forest Park
 Black Bear Park (Latchford)
 Brickfields Park (Orford)
 Bruche Park
 Burtonwood Nature Park
 Centre Park
 Culcheth Linear Park
 Lumb Brook Valley
 Lymm Dam
 New Cut Heritage and Ecology Park
 Orford Park
 Paddington Meadows
 Peel Hall Park
 Ridgway Grundy Memorial Park (Lymm)
 Risley Moss
 Rixton Clay Pits
 Sankey Valley Park
 St Elphin's Park
 St. Peter's Park
 The Twiggeries
 Trans Pennine Trail
 Turkey Pond Park 
 Victoria Park
 Walton Hall and Gardens
 Woolston Park

See also

List of parks and open spaces in Cheshire
List of Sites of Special Scientific Interest in Cheshire

Warrington

Warrington